Ytre-Standal is a small village in the Hjørundfjord area of the municipality of Ørsta, Møre og Romsdal, Norway.  The village has a population of approximately 3 people and in the weekends above 20. Ytre-Standal is located on the Hjørundfjorden in between the villages of Store-Standal and Festøya.  The village is located among the Sunnmørsalpene mountains.

As with many villages rural areas, populations have been gradually decreasing as living off the land is no longer viable in modernized countries.

At Ytre-Standal, Marine Harvest has one of their hatcheries (cold water) employing approximately 7 people.

References

External links
Ytre-Standal and Stavset - official website

Villages in Møre og Romsdal
Ørsta